The FA Cup 1962–63 is the 82nd season of the world's oldest football knockout competition; The Football Association Challenge Cup, or FA Cup for short. The large number of clubs entering the tournament from lower down the English football league system meant that the competition started with a number of preliminary and qualifying rounds. The 30 victorious teams from the Fourth Round Qualifying progressed to the First Round Proper.

1st qualifying round

Ties

Replays

2nd replay

2nd qualifying round

Ties

Replays

3rd qualifying round

Ties

Replays

4th qualifying round
The teams that given byes to this round are Walthamstow Avenue, West Auckland Town, Gateshead, Bishop Auckland, Wycombe Wanderers, Yeovil Town, Hereford United, South Shields, Worcester City, King's Lynn, Guildford City, Chelmsford City, Rhyl, Blyth Spartans, Margate, Bath City, Wisbech Town, Ashford Town, Kettering Town, Weymouth, Morecombe, Romford, Dartford and Brierley Hill Alliance.

Ties

Replays

2nd replay

1962–63 FA Cup
See 1962-63 FA Cup for details of the rounds from the First Round Proper onwards.

External links
 Football Club History Database: FA Cup 1962–63
 FA Cup Past Results

Qual